François Gaspard Aimé Lanno (1800 in Rennes – 1871 in Beaumont-du-Gâtinais) was a French sculptor. He was a pupil of François-Frédéric Lemot and Pierre Cartellier. In 1827, he won jointly with Jean-Louis Jaley the Prix de Rome for sculpture with a bas-relief Mucius Scævola devant Porsenna.

Works
 Camille rompant le traité avec Brennus, 1827, bas-relief, plaster, École des Beaux Arts, Paris
 Mucius Scævola devant Porsenna, 1827, bas-relief, plaster, École des Beaux Arts, Paris
 Joven Mercurio, 1829, marble, École des Beaux Arts, Paris
 François Fénelon, one of the figures at the Fountain of the Four Bishops, stone, Place Saint-Sulpice, Paris
 La Récolte des fruits, statue, bronze, fountain on the Place de la Concorde, Paris
 Portrait de Nicolas Poussin, Portrait de Eustache Le Sueur, medallions, Paris, École nationale supérieure des Beaux-Arts, facade of the Palais des Études
 Portrait de Guillaume Gouffier, bust, plaster, Palace of Versailles, Versailles
 Apollon et les neuf Muses, 1835, ten statues, theater, Rennes
 Blaise Pascal, statue, stone, Cour Napoléon, Louvre, Paris
 Esprit Fléchier, statue, stone, also at the Louvre

Bibliography
 Pierre Kjellberg, Le Nouveau guide des statues de Paris, La Bibliothèque des Arts, Paris, 1988
 Emmanuel Schwartz, Les Sculptures de l'École des Beaux-Arts de Paris. Histoire, doctrines, catalogue, École nationale supérieure des Beaux-Arts, Paris, 2003

References

1800 births
1871 deaths
Artists from Rennes
Prix de Rome for sculpture
19th-century French sculptors
French male sculptors
19th-century French male artists